Steve Ellis (born 29 February 1968) is a British lightweight rower. He won a gold medal at the 1994 World Rowing Championships in Indianapolis with the lightweight men's eight.

References

1968 births
Living people
British male rowers
World Rowing Championships medalists for Great Britain